The DirectDraw Surface container file format (uses the filename extension DDS), is a  Microsoft format for storing data compressed with the previously proprietary S3 Texture Compression (S3TC) algorithm, which can be decompressed in hardware by GPUs. This makes the format useful for storing graphical textures and cubic environment maps as a data file, both compressed and uncompressed. The file extension for this data format is '.dds'.

History
This format was introduced with DirectX 7.0. In DirectX 8.0, support for volume textures was added. With Direct3D 10, the file format was extended to allow an array of textures to be included, as well as support for new Direct3D 10.x and 11 texture formats.

Initial DDS support landed in GIMP 2.10.10 released on April 4, 2019.

See also
DirectX
Direct3D
DirectDraw
DXTn (S3 Texture Compression)

References

External links
 Programming Guide for DDS
 Example .dds loader in C++
 NVIDIA Texture Tools
 DDS Converter
 DDSTextureLoader
 List of DDS Formats

Draw Surface DirectDraw Surface
Graphics file formats